Kim Geun-Chol (born June 24, 1983) is South Korean footballer who plays for PTT Rayong in the Thai Division 1 League. He was regarded as one of the decent young midfielders. And he had a competitive relationship with Daejeon Citizen midfielder Kwon Jip, who had a role of playmaker in Dongbuk High school.

Kim previously played for Shonan Bellmare in the J2 League.

Club statistics

Club honours
At Gyeongnam FC
Hauzen Cup third place: 1
 2006
Korean FA Cup runner-up: 1
 2008

References

External links

1983 births
Living people
People from Seongnam
South Korean footballers
South Korean expatriate footballers
Daegu FC players
Gyeongnam FC players
Busan IPark players
Jeonnam Dragons players
Gwangju FC players
K League 1 players
Júbilo Iwata players
Shonan Bellmare players
J1 League players
J2 League players
China League One players
Expatriate footballers in Japan
South Korean expatriate sportspeople in Japan
Expatriate footballers in China
Expatriate footballers in Thailand
Association football midfielders
Sportspeople from Gyeonggi Province